One Piece is a Japanese manga series written and illustrated by Eiichiro Oda that has been translated into various languages and spawned a substantial media franchise. It follows the adventures of a young man named Monkey D. Luffy, whose body gains the properties of rubber from accidentally eating a supernatural fruit which is called the devil fruit, as he travels the oceans in search of the' titular treasure and gathers himself a diverse crew of pirates, named the Straw Hats. In Japan, the series is published by Shueisha—chapterwise in the shōnen manga anthology Weekly Shōnen Jump since July 22, 1997, and in tankōbon format since December 24, 1997. The series spans over 1000 chapters and, has 105 tankōbon volumes, making One Piece the 22nd longest manga series by volume count.

In the United States and Canada, Viz Media publishes its English language adaptation of the series—chapterwise in the manga anthology Shonen Jump since the magazine's launch in November 2002 and in tankōbon format since June 2003. In the United Kingdom, the tankōbon were published by Gollancz Manga, starting in March 2006, until Viz Media replaced it after the fourteenth volume. In Australia and New Zealand, the English volumes have been distributed by Madman Entertainment since November 10, 2008. By October 6, 2009, only 22 volumes had been released in English. However, as announced in July 2009, Viz Media increased that number to 53 by June 2010, using an accelerated publishing schedule of five volumes per month during the first half of 2010. , a total of 101 volumes of the English version have been officially released by Viz Media.


Volume list

Volumes 1–20

Volumes 21–40

Volumes 41–60

Volumes 61–80

Volumes 81–100

Volumes 101–current

Digitally colored version

See also
 List of One Piece media

References

External links
  of Weekly Shōnen Jump 
  of Viz Media

Manga Volumes
One Piece
Manga Volumes